Satakunnansilta (the ″Satakunta Bridge″) is an old bridge in Tampere, Finland, that crosses the Tammerkoski rapids north of Hämeensilta. The bridge is part of the Satakunnankatu street and is used by both vehicle traffic and pedestrians.

The Satakunta Bridge was designed by engineer Karl Snellman, son of Senator J. V. Snellman. It was built between 1897 and 1900 and commissioned on October 9, 1900. The bridge is a 6-span stone arch bridge with spans of 17 meters. The width of the bridge is 11.75 meters and its total length is 112.6 meters.

In 2013, the bridge railings were refurbished to the original model, and in 2014, the bridge lamps were replaced with the original model.

References

External links 

Satakunnansilta (in Finnish)
An aerial panorama of the Satakunta Bridge (in Finnish)

Bridges completed in 1900
Bridges in Finland
Buildings and structures in Tampere
Kyttälä
Arch bridges
Transport in Tampere